The Invicta Fighting Championship also known as Invicta FC, is an American mixed martial arts (MMA) organization for female fighters. It was founded in 2012 by Janet Martin and Shannon Knapp.

Each fight record has four categories: wins, losses, draws, and no-contests (NC). All fight records in this article are displayed in that order, with fights resulting in a no-contest listed in parentheses.

Featherweights (145 lb, 65 kg)

Bantamweights (135 lb, 61 kg)

Flyweights (125 lb, 56 kg)

Strawweights (115 lb, 52 kg)

Atomweights (105 lb, 48 kg)

See also

Invicta Champions
Invicta FC events
List of current UFC fighters
List of current ACA fighters
List of current Bellator fighters
List of current Brave CF fighters
List of current KSW fighters
List of current ONE fighters
List of current PFL fighters
List of current Rizin FF fighters
List of current Road FC fighters

Notes

References

fighters
Lists of mixed martial artists
Women's sport-related lists
Women's mixed martial arts